{{DISPLAYTITLE:Nu1 Columbae}}

Nu1 Columbae, Latinized from ν1 Columbae, is a star in the southern constellation of Columba. It is visible to the naked eye, having an apparent visual magnitude of 6.14. According to the Bortle scale, stars with this magnitude are faintly visible from dark rural skies. Based upon an annual parallax shift of 25.40 mas, this star is about 128 light years distant from the Sun.

This star has a stellar classification of F0 IV, which indicates it is an evolving F-type subgiant star. It is an estimated 6410 million years of age, with a mass 1.41 times that of the Sun. The star is spinning relatively rapidly, with a projected rotational velocity of 161 km/s. It is radiating around 4.3 times the solar luminosity from its outer atmosphere at an effective temperature of 7,079 K.

References

F-type subgiants
Columba (constellation)
Columbae, Nu1
Durchmusterung objects
037430
026412
01926